Mykhaylo Basarab (born March 28, 1988) is a Ukrainian footballer.

Playing career 
Basarab began playing football in 2005 with FC Chornohora Ivano-Frankivsk in the Ukrainian Second League. In 2006, he made the jump to the Ukrainian First League with FC Spartak Ivano-Frankivsk. After his brief stint in the First League he would have several stints in the Second League with FC Podillya Khmelnytskyi, FC Naftovyk Dolyna, FC Karpaty Yaremche, FC Nyva-V Vinnytsia, and FC Skala Stryi. He returned to the First League in the 2011/2012 season on a loan deal to FC Lviv. Then finished off his career in Ukraine with PFC Nyva Ternopil, and FC Karpaty Broshniv-Osada. In 2015, he went abroad to play with Toronto Atomic FC in the Canadian Soccer League. 

In 2018, he was named executive director for FC Naftovyk Dolyna.

References 

1988 births
Living people
Ukrainian footballers
FC Chornohora Ivano-Frankivsk players
FC Spartak Ivano-Frankivsk players
FC Podillya Khmelnytskyi players
FC Naftovyk Dolyna players
FC Nyva Vinnytsia players
FC Skala Stryi (2004) players
FC Lviv players
FC Nyva Ternopil players
Toronto Atomic FC players
Canadian Soccer League (1998–present) players
Association football defenders
Ukrainian First League players
Ukrainian Second League players